The Manila shawl (Spanish: mantón de Manila or mantón de seda)  is an embroidered silk shawl derived from the Filipino pañuelo. They were popular in the Philippines, Latin America and Spain during the colonial era. It also became popular in European fashions in the 19th century. In modern times, it is still an aspect in various traditional clothing in Hispanic cultures, and is particularly prominent as part of the costume (traje de flamenca) of flamenco dancers (bailaoras) and Gitana women.

Description

Manila shawls are square pieces of silk embroidered in chinoiserie-style motifs. The shawls were folded in half like a triangle and worn over the shoulders.

History

Traditional shawls in the Philippines were known as alampay, these were head and neck coverings among pre-colonial Tagalog women. Like the later Manila shawls, they were square and were folded in half into a triangle to be worn over the shoulders. These were carried over into the Spanish colonial period and acquired European design motifs like floral embroidery (using techniques like calado, sombrado, and deshilado). In addition to the native abacá fiber, they were also made from piña fiber, acquired from pineapples introduced by the Spanish. They also featured borders of lace or knotted fringes, a Spanish element which itself were acquired from the Moors. These Spanish-style shawls were known as pañuelos in Philippine Spanish, and were an integral part of the traditional traje de mestiza fashion of aristocratic Filipino women, as they brought modesty to the relatively low neckline of the traditional camisa shirts. They were also luxury goods exported via the Manila galleons to Nueva España and Europe, sometimes as gifts to royalty.

Silk, though attempted numerous times, never became an established industry in the Philippines. Silk fabrics remained a Chinese monopoly, prompting the Spanish Empire to restrict silk trade with China in 1535, then banning it altogether in 1718, due to the worries about the depletion of silver in Spanish treasuries. However, following protests by the middlemen in Manila, the silk ban was lifted in 1734, though it required silk to pass through Manila. This monopoly of Manila was later consolidated with the creation of the Royal Company of the Philippines in 1795.

Capitalizing on this new demand, Chinese factories in Canton (modern Guangzhou) and Macau started producing large quantities of painted or embroidered silk in the 18th century, for the sole purpose of exporting them to the Philippines and from there to further Spanish colonies and to Europe.

Silk in domestic Chinese markets were usually reserved for clothing, and the designs had symbolic significance based on social status. But these silk exports by China during the 17th to 19th centuries were non-traditional items tailored to the tastes of the European market. In particular, they mass-produced religious vestments for the Catholic clergy, tapestries, and pañuelo-style shawls. Although these early Chinese-made shawls typically featured Chinese motifs in the embroidery, like dragons, birds, butterflies, toads, lotus, flowers, and Chinese people and scenes, they also adapted non-Chinese conventions like the fringes that the Chinese observed from the Philippines.

These silk shawls became immensely popular in the Philippines and were quickly adopted into the local fashions of upper class Luzon women in the 18th and 19th centuries. Similarly, they became widely sought-after luxury exports soon after they reached the Americas. They are believed to have influenced later designs of the rebozo of Latin America.

Their popularity in Spain increased after Mexico's independence in 1815. The trade ships from Manila, which previously had to stop over in Acapulco, now had direct routes to Seville. During part of the 19th century, romanticism took over and Parisian fashions dictated that the shoulders of women should be left uncovered. Spanish women copied the fashion and they found that the Manila shawl was a very good thing to wear with these dresses, as the shawl provided some warmth to the bare shoulders. The Manila shawl was also used to decorate grand pianos in houses, as can be seen in the recently reopened Museo del Romanticismo in Madrid. Besides pianos, the shawl was also used to decorate sofas in elegant houses. Many Spanish houses today still use the Manila shawls to decorate pianos and sofas.

However, with the loss of the Philippines in 1898 in the aftermath of the Spanish–American War, Spain finally lost access to the silk trade. This spurred local weavers to recreate the embroideries in chinoiserie, favoring designs suited for European tastes while doing away with undesirable motifs like toads (a symbol of wealth in China) and pagodas. Their embroideries became denser and more colorful, with larger flowers resembling chintz. The knotted fringes also gradually became longer, accentuating movements by women as they walked or danced.

Modern cultural significance

Philippines

Mantón de Manila are still worn in the Philippines as a rarer alternative to the pañuelo. They are part of the traje de mestiza ensemble (the aristocratic version of the national dress, the baro't saya). They may also be worn with the modern terno, a unified gown version of the baro't saya.

Spain
Today, the Manila shawls are still very popular in Andalusia for festive occasions. Women use the shawls for dressing up and going to parties. During the Festival of the Crosses of May in Cordoba, balconies are dressed up with the shawl that add a bright look to the plazas. During the April Fair in Seville, most of the women in Gypsy dress (flamenco dress) use the shawl as an accessory. The Manila shawl is also used by female flamenco dancers during their dance, as it is a great dance enhancer and adds drama when the flamenco dancer twirls it around her body and in the air. Sara Baras and Maria Pages are two of the most best flamenco dancers in Spain and they are experts in twirling their shawls during the dance. Famous Spanish singers who sing the copla, a traditional form of song, also are dressed in the Manila shawl. One of the most popular singers of this genre is Isabel Pantoja, and she has a great variety of beautiful Manila shawls.

Many of the cheaper modern Manila shawls are imported from China, and they may range in price from 20 to 300 euros, depending on the amount of embroidery used. The cheaper ones are made of polyester, and the more expensive ones are made of silk. The best Manila shawls found in Spain today are made of silk and are made in Seville, and they are priced from 300 to 2000 euros. One can see the most beautiful Manila shawls by walking along Calle Sierpes, one of the principal pedestrian streets in Seville. The Manila shawl is an integral part of Spanish culture today.

See also
Pañuelo
Rebozo
Mantilla
Baro't saya
Barong tagalog
Guayabera

References

External links
 esflamenco online store
 Borca, S.A.
 Almacenes del Pilar
 El mantón de Manila (The Manila silk shawl)
 Spanish Passion

Shawls and wraps
Spanish clothing
Philippine clothing
Culture in Manila
Embroidery